Rivularia is a genus of cyanobacteria of the family Rivulariaceae.

Description
Rivularia is found growing on submerged stones, moist rocks, and damp soils near the riverside. It is found in colonies, and the trichomes are radially arranged within a colony, with each trichome wholly or partially surrounded by a gelatinous sheet. The trichomes have a basal heterocyst. Each trichome has a narrow aptic portion which is whip- or tail-like consisting of a row of small cells. Akinetes are absent in Rivularia. The species multiply with the aid of hormogonia and heterocyst.

Species
 Rivularia atra Roth ex Bornet & Flahault, 1886
 Rivularia bullata (Poir) Berkeley ex Bornet & Flahault, 1886
 Rivularia haematites (De Candolle) Bornet & Flahault, 1886
 Rivularia jaoi H.-J.Chu, 1952
 Rivularia nitida C.Agardh ex Bornet & Flahault, 1886
 Rivularia thermalis Y.-Y.Li, 1984
Species brought into synonymy
 Rivularia cornudamae Roth, 1797: synonym of Chaetophora lobata Schrank, 1783
 Rivularia elegans Roth, 1802: synonym of Chaetophora elegans (Roth) C.Agardh, 1812
 Rivularia endiviaefolia Roth, 1798: synonym of Chaetophora lobata Schrank, 1783
 Rivularia lloydii P.Crouan & H.Crouan, 1867: synonym of Brachytrichia lloydii (P.Crouan & H.Crouan) P.C.Silva, 1996
 Rivularia multifida Weber & Mohr, 1804: synonym of Nemalion multifidum (F.Weber & D.Mohr) Chauvin, 1842
 Rivularia plana Harvey, 1833: synonym of Isactis plana (Harvey) Thuret ex Bornet & Flahault, 1886
 Rivularia rubra (Hudson) Wahlenberg, 1826: synonym of Nemalion helminthoides (Velley) Batters, 1902
 Rivularia tuberiformis Smith, 1809: synonym of Leathesia marina (Lyngbye) Decaisne, 1842
 Rivularia vermiculata Smith, 1808: synonym of Mesogloia vermiculata (Smith) S.F.Gray, 1821
 Rivularia zosterae Mohr, 1810: synonym of Eudesme virescens (Carmichael ex Berkeley) J.Agardh, 1882

References

Further reading

 Silva, C., P. Basson & R. Moe (1996). Catalogue of the Benthic Marine Algae of the Indian Ocean. Volume 79 of University of California Publications in Botany. 

Rivulariaceae
Cyanobacteria genera
Taxa named by Carl Adolph Agardh